Malta competed at the 2019 World Aquatics Championships in Gwangju, South Korea from 12 to 28 July.

Swimming

Malta entered four swimmers.

Men

Women

References

Nations at the 2019 World Aquatics Championships
Malta at the World Aquatics Championships
2019 in Maltese sport